Holroyd River is a locality in the Shire of Cook, Queensland, Australia.

Geography
The Archer River forms a small part of the northern boundary.

References 

Shire of Cook
Localities in Queensland